Brachinus ejaculans is a species of ground beetle in the Brachininae subfamily that can be found in Bulgaria, Albania, Greece, Hungary, Moldova, Luxembourg, Romania, Ukraine, southern part of Russia, and in every state of former Yugoslavia, but it is doubtful whether it is present in Slovenia. It can also be found in East Palaearctic, Near and Middle Eastern countries, including Afghanistan, Armenia, Azerbaijan, Georgia, Iran, Iraq, Kazakhstan, Kyrgyzstan, Turkmenistan, Turkey, Uzbekistan, Israel, Jordan, Lebanon, Syria, and Sinai Peninsula of Egypt.

References

Beetles described in 1828
Beetles of Asia
Beetles of Europe
Brachininae